Jiří Dopita (born 2 December 1968 in Šumperk, Czechoslovakia) is former Czech professional ice hockey player, and currently hockey coach. He has played in the Czech Elite League most of his career. He briefly played in the National Hockey League. Dopita has primarily played center throughout his career.

Playing career
Early in his career, Dopita attracted little notice as a professional prospect. At age 23, Dopita was selected in the sixth round of the 1992 NHL Entry Draft by the Boston Bruins, but never came to North America while the Bruins owned his rights. However, starting in 1993, Dopita joined the German Bundesliga with Eisbären Berlin, averaging over a point per game in the Bundeliga and with Berlin's later entry in the Deutsche Eishockey Liga.

Starting in the 1995–96 season, Dopita returned to his native Czech Republic and played with HC Vsetín of the Czech Extraliga. Dopita continued his scoring pace in the Czech Republic, averaging over a point per game every year in six seasons with Vsetín, compiling 315 career points, and being selected again in the NHL draft, this time in 1998 being selected in the 5th round at 123rd overall by the New York Islanders. However, once again, Dopita would not play with the Islanders. And at the 1999 NHL Entry Draft, his right were traded to the Florida Panthers for a 5th round choice that year.

By the late 1990s, some, such as the Hockey News, considered Dopita the best player outside the NHL. He was a member of the gold medal-winning Czech team at the 1998 Winter Olympics, and was named Czech player of the year in 2001, the first non-NHLer to win the award since Roman Turek in 1994. When it became clear that Dopita still did not seem to have interest in coming to North America, his NHL rights were moved again at the 2001 NHL Entry Draft to the Philadelphia Flyers for a 2nd round selection that year, the Flyers made a concerted effort to bring Dopita to the NHL. The Flyers had convinced Dopita's former Vsetin HC teammate Roman Cechmanek to come to North America prior to the previous season and the 32-year-old Dopita agreed to join him in Philadelphia for the 2001–02 NHL season.

However, Dopita's time in the NHL was to be disappointing. He recorded respectable totals getting limited ice time with Philadelphia, including a four-goal game against the Atlanta Thrashers, but a knee injury limited him to 52 games. After the season, his rights were traded to the Edmonton Oilers, where he was expected to be a top-two centre. However, Dopita had a terrible season, recording only six points in 21 games.

After only two years in the NHL, Dopita returned to the Czech Republic, this time with Pardubice HC. In his second year with Pardubice, at age 36, Dopita recorded less than a point per game in European competition for the first time since his time with Olomouc HC. For 2005–06, Dopita joined HC JME Znojemští Orli and has remained with the team for 2006–07 season too.

On 5 May 2006 Dopita became the majority shareholder of Olomouc HC.

Dopita is currently the head coach of VHK Vsetín.

Awards and achievements
 Olympic gold medal winner for the Czech Republic in the 1998 Winter Olympics in Nagano
 IIHF World Champion: 1996, 2000, 2001
Golden Stick Award: 2001 (the highest trophy an ice hockey player can get in the Czech Republic)
 Czech Extraliga – Champion: 1994, 1996, 1997, 1998, 1999, 2001, 2005
 Czech Extraliga – Regular Season MVP: 1997, 1998, 1999, 2001
 Czech Extraliga – Play-Off MVP: 1994, 1996, 1998, 2001
 Czech Extraliga – Leading Goal Scorer: 1997, 2000
 German DEL – Leading Point Scorer: 1995

Career statistics

Regular season and playoffs

International

External links
 
 Jiří Dopita's profile at HC Znojemští Orli webpage

1968 births
Living people
Boston Bruins draft picks
Czech ice hockey centres
Czech ice hockey coaches
Edmonton Oilers players
Eisbären Berlin players
HC Olomouc players
HC Kometa Brno players
HC Dynamo Pardubice players
HC Tábor players
Orli Znojmo players
Ice hockey players at the 1998 Winter Olympics
Ice hockey players at the 2002 Winter Olympics
Medalists at the 1998 Winter Olympics
New York Islanders draft picks
Olympic gold medalists for the Czech Republic
Olympic ice hockey players of the Czech Republic
Olympic medalists in ice hockey
People from Šumperk
Philadelphia Flyers players
VHK Vsetín players
Sportspeople from the Olomouc Region
Czech expatriate ice hockey players in the United States
Czech expatriate ice hockey players in Germany
Expatriate ice hockey players in the United States